Henry Howorth (2 August 1834 – 8 January 1907) was a 19th-century Member of Parliament in Otago, New Zealand.

References

1834 births
1907 deaths
Members of the New Zealand House of Representatives
New Zealand MPs for Dunedin electorates
19th-century New Zealand politicians